Kickboxing for the 2013 Asian Indoor and Martial Arts Games was held at the Dowon Gymnasium, Incheon, South Korea. It took place from 3 to 6 July 2013. Previously, in 2009, this sport was contested at both Hanoi (Asian Indoor Games) and Bangkok (Asian Martial Arts Games) separately.

Medalists

Point fighting

Full contact

Low kick

Medal table

Results

Point fighting

Men's 63 kg

Men's 74 kg

Women's 55 kg

Full contact

Men's 57 kg

 Jarah Theweni of Kuwait originally finished 9th, but was disqualified after he tested positive for Amiloride and Hydrochlorothiazide.

Men's 71 kg

Women's 56 kg

Low kick

Men's 63.5 kg

Men's 81 kg

Women's 52 kg

 Zhadyra Kuanysheva of Kazakhstan originally finished 5th, but was disqualified after she tested positive for Furosemide.

References

External links
 

2013
2013 Asian Indoor and Martial Arts Games events
Asian